Food for Thought was a vegetarian restaurant in the Seven Dials district of London's Covent Garden. Founded in 1971 in a former banana warehouse, it later closed in 2015 due to rising rents.

History
The restaurant was founded by Margot Boyce-White in 1971 when the relocation of London's fruit and vegetable market to New Covent Garden caused the area to be redeveloped.  The premises in Neal Street had formerly been used as a banana warehouse. The business changed hands in 1977 and was owned by Vanessa Garrett, daughter of the couple John and Jane Damant, who bought it.  Rising rents caused the restaurant to close on 21 June 2015.

The counter-culture activist Sue Miles worked at Food for Thought, so starting a career as a restaurateur.

The restaurant was patronised by workers in the nearby businesses of the Covent Garden district, which included the numerous theatres.  Acts which ate there included the Red Hot Chili Peppers.

Cuisine
The food at the restaurant was vegetarian and some of it was vegan.  Fresh vegetables were used but, to keep the cost down, these were not normally organic,   The preparation avoided peeling to preserve the nutrients in the skin of the vegetables.

Reception
Russell Rose, reviewing the place for Veggie & Organic London, rated it five stars for vegetarian choice and three stars for taste.

Gallery

Cookbook 
A cookbook composed of the restaurant's recipes called "New Food for Thought" by Jane Stimpson was published in 2002.

See also 
 List of restaurants in London
 List of vegetarian restaurants
Cranks

References

Vegetarian restaurants in the United Kingdom
Defunct restaurants in London
Defunct vegetarian restaurants
Restaurants in London